Keltie Glacier is a large Antarctic glacier,  long, draining from Pain Névé southwest around the southern extremity of the Commonwealth Range, and then northwest to enter Beardmore Glacier at Ranfurly Point. It was discovered by the British Antarctic Expedition, 1907–09, under Ernest Shackleton, who named it for Sir John Scott Keltie, Secretary of the Royal Geographical Society, 1892–1915.

See also
 List of glaciers in the Antarctic

References

Glaciers of Dufek Coast
Queen Maud Mountains